Antirhea aromatica is a species of plant in the family Rubiaceae. It is endemic to Veracruz state, in eastern Mexico. It is an endangered species, threatened by habitat loss.

References

aromatica
Endemic flora of Mexico
Flora of Veracruz
Endangered biota of Mexico
Endangered plants
Taxonomy articles created by Polbot
Taxobox binomials not recognized by IUCN